OCESA Teatro is a division of Grupo CIE. It is dedicated to produce and promote theater, especially in Mexico City, being the largest producer in Mexico and Latin America.

History
The theater division of OCESA, part of Grupo CIE (Corporación Interamericana de Entretenimiento), was created in 1997 for the production of stage plays and musicals. The first play produced was Confesiones de Mujeres de 30 and later Disney's Beauty and the Beast. Both plays became a great success and so did OCESA's Theater division. Moving from the Orfeon Theater where Beauty and the Beast was playing, the company was seeking to build or buy their own theaters for large format musicals. In 1999 RENT and The Phantom Of The Opera were simultaneously played at the newly rebuilt Alameda Theaters.  In 2000, Telmex bought both theaters to become part of the Centro Cultural Telmex (Telmex Cultural Center) which consists of two theaters, with capacity of 2,254 for Theatre 1 and 1,200 seats for Theatre 2, an art gallery and a small shopping center. An agreement was signed between Telmex and OCESA to let OCESA operate the theaters and present exclusively OCESA productions. OCESA Teatro is nowadays, the biggest producer of dramatic and musical theater in Latin America; producing each year at least two Broadway-style shows and two or three plays. It is associated with companies in Buenos Aires, Sao Paulo, Madrid, Barcelona and Portugal to help them reduce costs and risks linked with big budget productions and to share them copyrights, music, adaptations, sets or even cast members among the associates. Most productions include well known actors from other media but specially those popularized by television. Their shows are characterized for having very high standards of quality and competition is almost nonexistent.

Productions

Musicals

Plays
 Confesiones de Mujeres de 30.
 Master Class.
 Nosotras Que Nos Queremos Tanto.
 The Vagina Monologues.
 Las Obras Completas de William Shakespeare Abreviadas.
 Defending the Caveman.
 Las Viejas Vienen Marchando.
 Todos Tenemos Problemas (Sexuales).
 Proof.
 No Más Sexo.
 Three Tall Women.
 La Obra del Bebe.
 Black Comedy.
 Generacion Atari.
 El Método Grönholm.
 Orgasmos, la Comedia.
 Des-Madres.
 Doubt.
 Visiting Mr. Green.
 Emociones Encontradas.
 Chicas Católicas.
 Legends.
 The Diary of Anne Frank.
 The Blonde, the Brunette and the Vengeful Redhead.
 Same Time, Next Year.
 Fat Pig.
 August: Osage County.
 Almost, Maine.
 Sexy Laundry.

Criticism
OCESA Teatro has received complains for not offering an equal opportunity casting selection process in many of their productions. Several shows were criticized for casting famous figures in main roles, mostly actors made popular by television, only for their attraction power, even if their appearance notably miscast those roles. Also they have been criticized for creating a pool of main actors that continuously reappear in their shows, closing the doors to upcoming actors and becoming a tightly closed group. OCESA Teatro however considers itself the biggest promoter of new talent in Latin America.

Also OCESA Teatro has received complains about how the company strives to recreate exactly the Broadway experience in most of their shows, leaving little freedom of expression to local directors. OCESA Teatro has responded that this is due to copyright restrictions established in the contracts of the original plays; however, despite those directors' complains, the company's most successful shows are those who have been kept faithful to their original Broadway counterparts.

External links
Currently Playing and upcoming Productions
Business Page
Grupo Cie

References

Theatre companies in Mexico